NGC 3599 is a lenticular galaxy located in the constellation Leo. It was discovered by William Herschel on March 14, 1784.

References

External links 
 

3599
Unbarred lenticular galaxies
Galaxies discovered in 1784
Leo (constellation)